Tatar Canadians are Canadian citizens of Tatar descent residing in Canada. According to the 2011 Census there were 2,850 Canadians who claimed Tatar ancestry. Most of them (1,245−2,000) live in Toronto, Ontario.

Every year, a group of Tatar activists organizes Sabantuy festival in Montreal, which brings together Tatars and members of other Turkic diasporas from all over the country.

Notable Tatar Canadians 
 Daria Gaiazova, Canadian cross-country skier

References

External links 
 Montreal Tatar Association

Ethnic groups in Canada
Asian Canadian
Tatar diaspora
Turkic diaspora in North America